Charles Wallace Stewart (9 June 1885 – 4 March 1950) was a Progressive party member of the House of Commons of Canada. He was born in York County, Ontario and became a farmer. From 1908 to 1918, he was reeve of Pleasantdale, Saskatchewan,

The son of Stephen W.L Stewart and Sarah Pattenden, Stewart was educated in Brandon, Manitoba and Winnipeg. In 1911, he married Frances H. Singer. He was elected to Parliament at the Humboldt riding in the 1921 general election. After serving his only federal term, the 14th Canadian Parliament, Stewart was defeated in the 1925 federal election by Albert Frederick Totzke of the Liberal party. He died of liver and colon cancer in 1950.

References

External links
 

1885 births
1948 deaths
Canadian farmers
Members of the House of Commons of Canada from Saskatchewan
People from the Regional Municipality of York
Progressive Party of Canada MPs